The Polish Athletic Association ( – PZLA) is the governing body for the sport of athletics in Poland. Current president is Henryk Olszewski.

History 
PZLA was founded in 1919 and was affiliated to the IAAF in 1921.

Former presidents:
 1919–1921: Tadeusz Kuchar
 1921–1926: Bronisław Kowalewski
 1926–1930: Jerzy Misiński
 1930–1939: Wacław Znajdowski
 1945–1949: Walenty Foryś
 1949–1965: Czesław Foryś
 1965–1967: Michał Godlewski
 1967: Henryk Krzemiński
 1967–1969: Witold Gerutto
 1969–1972: Andrzej Majkowski
 1972–1973: Adam Zborowski
 1973–1976: Piotr Nurowski
 1976–1978: Stefan Milewski
 1978–1980: Piotr Nurowski
 1980–1984: Czesław Ząbecki
 1984–1986: Leszek Wysłocki
 1986–1988: Mieczysław Kolejwa (caretaker)
 1988–1989: Jan Mulak (curator PZLA)
 1989–1997: Czesław Ząbecki
 1997–2009: Irena Szewińska
 2009–2016: Jerzy Skucha
 2016–...: Henryk Olszewski

Affiliations 
PZLA is the national member federation for Poland in the following international organisations:
 World Athletics
 European Athletics (EA)

National records 
PZLA maintains the Polish records in athletics.

Kit suppliers 
Poland's kits are currently supplied by Polish sportswear company 4F.

References

External links 
  Official website

Poland
Athletics
Athletics in Poland
National governing bodies for athletics
Sports organizations established in 1919
1919 establishments in Poland